The Xingu River (Mẽbêngôkre: Byti) is a  river in north Brazil. It is a southeast tributary of the Amazon River and one of the largest clearwater rivers in the Amazon basin, accounting for about 5% of its water.



Description and history
The first Indigenous Park in Brazil was created in the river basin by the Brazilian government in the early 1960s. This park marks the first indigenous territory recognized by the Brazilian government and it was the world's largest indigenous preserve on the date of its creation. Currently, fourteen tribes live within Xingu Indigenous Park, surviving on natural resources and extracting from the river most of what they need for food and water.

The Brazilian government is building the Belo Monte Dam, which will be the world's third-largest hydroelectric dam, on the Lower Xingu. Construction of this dam is under legal challenge by environment and indigenous groups, who assert the dam would have negative environmental and social impacts along with reducing the flow by up to 80% along a  stretch known as the Volta Grande ("Big Bend"). The river flow in this stretch is highly complex and includes major sections of rapids. More than 450 fish species have been documented in the Xingu River Basin and it is estimated that the total is around 600 fish species, including many endemics. At least 193 fish species living in rapids are known from the lower Xingu, and at least 26 of these are endemic. From 2008 to 2018 alone, 24 new fish species have been described from the river. Many species are seriously threatened by the dam, which will significantly alter the flow in the Volta Grande rapids.

In the Upper Xingu region was a highly self-organized pre-Columbian anthropogenic landscape, including deposits of fertile agricultural terra preta, black soil in Portuguese, with a network of roads and polities each of which covered about 250 square kilometers.

Near the source of Xingu River is Culuene River, a  tributary.

In popular culture

The name is the title of a humorous Edith Wharton short story from 1911.
"Xingu" is the title of a song on Waterfall Cities, a 1999 album by Ozric Tentacles.
The river is also honoured in the album Aguas da Amazonia.
A beer produced near the river is sold in the international market under the name "Xingu".
In the novel Relic by Douglas Preston and Lincoln Child, the Xingu River is the location of the doomed Whittlesey/Maxwell expedition responsible for discovering evidence of the lost Kothoga tribe and their savage god Mbwun.
Xingu is a 2011 Brazilian movie, directed by Brazilian film-maker Cao Hamburger. The movie tells the story of the Villas-Bôas brothers 1943 expedition to the region, which led to the creation of the indigenous reserve twenty years later.
The Embraer Xingu is a design of twin-engine airplane manufactured in the 1970s by Brazilian company Embraer.

See also
Percy Fawcett
Aloysius Pendergast
Xingu Indigenous Park
Xingu peoples

References

 Cowell, Adrian. 1973. The Tribe that Hides from Man. The Bodely Head, London.
 Original text from 1911 Encyclopædia Britannica

Further  reading
Heinsdijk, Dammis, and Ricardo Lemos Fróes. Description of Forest-Types on "Terra Firme" between the Rio Tapajós and the Rio Xingú in the Amazon Valley. 1956.
Sipes, Ernest "Brazilian Indians: what FUNAI Won't Tell YOU". 2002.
Brazilian Indians: What FUNAI Won't Tell You

External links 

Tributaries of the Amazon River
Rivers of Mato Grosso
Rivers of Pará
Rivers of Xingu Indigenous Park